Clifford Cook Furnas (October 24, 1900 – April 27, 1969) was an American author, Olympic athlete, scientist, expert on guided missiles, university president, and public servant. He was first cousin of the author Evangeline Walton. Furnas participated in the 5,000-meter event at the 1920 Olympic Games in Antwerp, Belgium.

He taught chemical engineering at Yale University, and directed the airplane division of Curtiss-Wright during World War II. He became the ninth chancellor of the private University of Buffalo in 1954. After guiding the University through the merger process with the State University of New York in 1962, Furnas became the first president of the State University of New York at Buffalo. Between 1955 and 1957 he was on a leave of absence to serve as Assistant Secretary of Defense during the Eisenhower administration.

He retired from the University of Buffalo in 1966 and died in 1969.

Athletic career
 1920 Olympic Games, Antwerp, Belgium
 1922 Big Ten Conference Medal, for best combined scholastic and athletic record

Education
 1922 B.S., with honors, Purdue University
 1926 Ph.D., University of Michigan
 1946 Honorary Doctor of Engineering, Purdue University
 1957 Honorary Doctor of Engineering, University of Michigan
 1958 Honorary Doctor of Laws, Alfred University
 1960 Honorary Doctor of Science, Thiel College
 1963 Degree Honoris Causa, Universidad Nacional de Asunción of Paraguay

Academic career
 1922–1924 Math teacher, Shattuck School, Minnesota
 1924–1925 Research Chemist, U.S. Steel Corporation
 1926–1931 Physical Chemist, U.S. Bureau of Mines
 1931–1941 Associate Professor of Chemical Engineering, Yale University
 1941–1942 Technical aide at the National Defense Research Committee
 1943–1946 Director of Curtiss-Wright Aeronautical Research Laboratory in Buffalo, New York
 1946–1954 Director and Executive Vice President, Cornell Aeronautical Laboratory
 1954–1962 Chancellor, University at Buffalo
 1962–1966 President, State University of New York at Buffalo
 1962–1966 President, Western New York Nuclear Research
 1966–1969 President Emeritus, State University of New York at Buffalo

Government career
 1952–1953 Chairman, Guided Missile Commission, Research and Development Board
 1954–1957 Chairman, U.S. Department of Defense Advisory Panel on Aeronautics
 1954–1969 Member, U.S. Army Science Advisory Panel
 1955–1957 Member of the National Advisory Committee for Aeronautics
 1955–1957 Assistant Secretary of Defense for Research and Development
 1956–1957 Chairman, Air Navigation Development Board
 1957–1969 Member of the Defense Science Board
 1958–1969 Member of the Naval Research Advisory Committee
 1961–1965 Chairman of the Defense Science Board
 1961–1969 Chairman, New York Advisory Council, Industrial Research and Development
 1968–1969 Vice-Chairman, National Research Council

Publications
 1932 America's Tomorrow: An Informal Excursion Into the Era of the Two-hour Working Day
 1935 The Unfinished Business of Science
 1936 The Next Hundred Years (full view from Hathi Trust)
 1937 Man, Bread and Destiny
 1937 Technological Trends and National Policy (section on metallurgy) (full view from Archive.org)
 1939 The Storehouse of Civilization (full view from Hathi Trust)
 1940 The Individual and the World
 1940 Excerpts from Our Intellectual World Sections 9-13, Division II of The Individual and the World'
 1948 Research in Industry 1957 "Sputnik: Why did the US lose the race? Critics speak up", Life Magazine, October 21, 1957
 1966 The Engineer''

References

External links
Clifford C. Furnas Collection, State University of New York at Buffalo
Papers of Clifford C. Furnas, Dwight D. Eisenhower Presidential Library
Furnas Family Album, University of Louisville Photographic Archives

1900 births
1969 deaths
Writers from Buffalo, New York
Track and field athletes from Buffalo, New York
American male middle-distance runners
Olympic track and field athletes of the United States
Athletes (track and field) at the 1920 Summer Olympics
Leaders of the University at Buffalo
University of Michigan alumni
United States Army Science Board people
United States Assistant Secretaries of Defense
Scientists from Buffalo, New York
20th-century American academics